Monarch Park Collegiate (referred to  MPC, Monarch Park or Monarch; formerly known as Monarch Park Secondary School) is a high school located near the intersection of Coxwell Avenue and Danforth Avenue in Toronto, Ontario, overseen by the Toronto Board of Education, which later merged into the Toronto District School Board in 1998.

History
Monarch Park Collegiate was the first high school built in Toronto after 1937.  Construction of the school began in March 1965, and was completed by late August at a cost of $3,751,654.69.  In 1966 a third storey was added at a cost of $1,245,210.

The school that would later be known as College Francais was founded here in 1979, before moving to Jarvis Collegiate in 1981.

Monarch Park Collegiate is an International Baccalaureate World School (2007).  It presently offers the IB Prep program (Grades 9 and 10) and the IB Diploma Programme (Grades 11 and 12) which started in September 2008.

Overview
Monarch Park Collegiate Institute offers a complete semestered program, open for extremely limited out-of-district student enrollment.  Monarch Park Collegiate is a 'Global School' that embraces a philosophy on global education, focusing on human rights education, peace education, international development and environmentalism. The staff and students are from over 100 different countries and speak almost as many languages.

Campus
In terms of facilities, the large group instruction room was constructed to allow topics to be presented to approximately 150 and also greatly reduced repetition of the same material. The library, located in the same wing of the school, was constructed with a mezzanine which is capable of seating about 80 students. This mezzanine was constructed so that students could study and be in easy reach of the library's research books and other material.  The auditorium, located in the same wing, was equipped with a lighting and acoustics system. The eastern wing was constructed with a modern swimming pool, measuring 75' × 35' and varying in depth from 3' to 9½'  lined on one side by a gallery. In the summer of 2011 the pool area underwent renovations after being temporarily closed the year before. During the 2009-2010 school year NDP party leader Jack Layton visited the school during an effort to help keep it open to the students and public. On the southern end of the school property is Monarch Park stadium, which has an artificial turf soccer field which can be transformed into a rugby, football or field hockey ground and also has a synthetic rubberized Olympic track. The stadium is able to operate year-round due to an air-supported structure placed on it during the winter, able to protect from the elements.

Other
The official mascot is the Monarch Park Lion to represent strength.

The film The Virgin Suicides, directed by Sofia Coppola filmed on location throughout the school.

Kenya Program
This was a program in Canada, where Monarch Park Collegiate partnered with Toronto-based Free the Children (FTC).  Thirteen students who were in the midst of studying courses on leadership, international development, human rights education and issues related to Africa and the developing world, traveled to Kenya In November 2006.  There, for a month, students worked with the peoples of the Maasai Mara building schools, planting trees, and teaching English.

Two years later, 13 Monarch Park students traveled to Kenya again, for 25 days. After returning to Toronto, students from both trips visited various schools within the GTA as Free the Children Ambassadors, telling their stories and urging students to get involved.

Monarch Park has continued to be one of the top contributing high schools to FTC, and was featured in chapter 7 of the organization's book, Me to We.

Notable students & alumni
Penny Oleksiak - Olympic champion swimmer (Rio 2016, Tokyo 2020); most decorated Canadian Olympian 

Eric Lindros - NHL hockey player. Played for Philadelphia, New York, Toronto, and Dallas. Retired 2007.

See also
List of high schools in Ontario

References

External links
Monarch Park Collegiate Institute
TDSB Profile

High schools in Toronto
Schools in the TDSB
International Baccalaureate schools in Ontario
Educational institutions established in 1964
1964 establishments in Ontario